Unterm Radar is a 2015 German television film directed by .

Plot

Cast 
Christiane Paul ... Elke Seeberg
Heino Ferch ... Heinrich Buch
Fabian Hinrichs ... Richard König
Inka Friedrich ... Anna Bittner
Matthias Matschke ... Tom Henskind
Hans Werner Meyer ... Ferdinand Hochheim
Linn Reusse ... Marie Seeberg (as Linn Sara Reusse)
Lara Mandoki ... Nina
Nursel Köse ... Amira
Mirko Lang ... Johannes

Awards

References

External links 
 

German television films
Films set in Germany
2015 television films
2015 films
2015 drama films
Films about terrorism
German drama films
2010s German-language films
2010s German films
Das Erste original programming